Johanna Amalia Witasek (13 August 1865 – 5 July 1910) was an Austrian botanist noted for her work on taxonomy, geographic distribution, and nomenclature.

Her last major work was on nightshade (Solanum) plants and appeared in 1909. This material came from the Samoa trip of Karl Rechinger and Lily Rechinger-Favarger. Rechinger's work of Botanical and Zoological Results, submitted to the Academy of Sciences in July 1909, was reprinted in 1910, including Witasek's contributions. The work was published in the same year.

Written works

References

1865 births
1910 deaths
Austro-Hungarian scientists
Austrian women scientists
20th-century Austrian botanists
19th-century Austrian botanists